Grant Mitton may refer to:

Grant Mitton (field hockey), Australian field hockey player
Grant Mitton (politician) (born 1941), Canadian radio talk show host and politician